Isidora Steinmetz (born ) is a Chilean female volleyball player. She is part of the Chile women's national volleyball team. She graduated as bachelor of psychology from Universidad de Los Andes.

She participated at the 2011 Women's Pan-American Volleyball Cup.

References

1994 births
Living people
Chilean women's volleyball players
Place of birth missing (living people)
21st-century Chilean women